Zoilus I Dicaeus (epithet means "the Just") was an Indo-Greek king who ruled  in Afghanistan and Pakistan  and occupied the areas of the Paropamisade and Arachosia previously held by Menander I. He may have belonged to the dynasty of Euthydemus I.

Time of reign
Zoilus used to be dated after the death of Menander, c. 130–120 BCE (Bopearachchi). Two coins of Zoilus I were however overstruck by Menander I  so Zoilus came to power while Menander was still alive and was perhaps his enemy. R. C. Senior has suggested some time between 150 and 135 BCE.

Coin types of Zoilos I

Zoilus I uses a silver coin type similar to that of Euthydemus II, son of Demetrius: Crowned Herakles standing, holding a wreath or diadem in his right hand, and a club and the lion skin in his left hand. On some of the coins, which are of lower artistic quality, Herakles is crowned by a small Nike. Zoilus I also struck rare gold-plated silver coins with portrait and Heracles.

In place of his Greek epithet "the just", Zoilus' Indian-standard coins bear the Pali title Dhramikasa ("Follower of the Dharma"), probably related to Buddhism. This is the first time this epithet appears on Indo-Greek coinage. A few monolingual Attic tetradrachms of Zoilos I have been found. Zoilus inherited (or took) several monograms from Menander I.

His bronze coins are square and original in that they combine the club of Heracles with a Scythian-type bowcase (for a short recurve bow) inside a victory wreath, suggesting contacts or even an alliance with horse-mounted people originating from the steppes, possibly either the Scythians (future Indo-Scythians), or the Yuezhi who had invaded Greco-Bactria. This bow can be contrasted to the traditional Hellenistic long bow depicted on the coins of the eastern Indo-Greek queen Agathokleia.

See also
 Indo-Greek Kingdom
 Greco-Buddhism
 Indo-Scythians

Notes

References
 The Greeks in Bactria and India, W. W. Tarn, Cambridge University Press

External links
Main coins of Zoilus I
Catalog of the coins of Zoilus I
Le Roi Zoile le Juste

Indo-Greek kings
2nd-century BC rulers in Asia
Greek Buddhist monarchs